Mourad Benmehidi (born 1 February 1953 in Annaba, Algeria) was the Permanent Representative to the United Nations for Algeria.  He took office in August 2008.  Benmehidi is married with three children.

Education
Benmehidi received a law degree at the University of Algiers.  He speaks four languages which include Arabic, English, French and German.

Career
Benmehidi was Algeria's Deputy Permanent Representative to the United Nations in New York, prior to taking the lead post.  He has held several other diplomatic posts which include Minister Counselor at Algeria's Mission to the United Nations; Foreign Ministry of Algeria: acting Deputy Director for Eastern Asia, Deputy Director responsible for Northern Europe, and Head of Human Rights at the Ministry of Foreign Affairs; postings at Algerian Embassies in Bonn, Germany and in Harare, Zimbabwe. He began his diplomatic career at the Foreign Ministry in 1982, in charge of the Office of South-South Cooperation and Regional and Inter-regional Conferences.

See also

List of Permanent Representatives to the UN

References

United Nation Press Release Presentation of Credentials: Benmehidi

External links

1953 births
Living people
Permanent Representatives of Algeria to the United Nations
Ambassadors of Algeria to Germany
People from Annaba
University of Algiers alumni
21st-century Algerian people